Folex may refer to:
 Counterfeit watch, a portmanteau of "faux" (fake) and the Rolex watch brand
 Methotrexate, by trade name Folex